"Don't Tell Me What to Do" is a song written by Harlan Howard and Max D. Barnes, and recorded by the American country music artist Pam Tillis. Her breakthrough single, it was released in December 1990 as the first single from the album Put Yourself in My Place. The song reached number 5 on the Billboard Hot Country Singles & Tracks chart.

Marty Stuart recorded this song in 1988 under the title "I'll Love You Forever (If I Want To)" for his Let There Be Country album, although the album was not released until 1992.

Chart performance

Year-end charts

References

1991 singles
Marty Stuart songs
Pam Tillis songs
Songs written by Harlan Howard
Songs written by Max D. Barnes
Song recordings produced by Paul Worley
Arista Nashville singles
1991 songs